Karl Platt (born March 14, 1978 in Novosibirsk) is a German mountain biker.

Life and career 
Platt grew up in Siberia until the age of ten, where his parents were banished during Stalinism. After the travel ban was relaxed under Mikhail Gorbachev, the family emigrated to Germany and lives since then in Osthofen.

In 1991 Platt bought a mountain bike and joined the LLG Wonnegau. As his first success he became German junior downhill-champion in 1996 and after his move to cross country cycling he won the Lake Garda Marathon in 2001.

His greatest achievements followed at the Cape Epic: He has won the South African mountain bike stage race five times since 2004. Except Platt only the Swiss Christoph Sauser also won the Cape Epic five times.

In addition, Platt 2008 and 2015 become German champion in the mountain bike marathon.

References

1978 births
Living people
German male cyclists
Cross-country mountain bikers
Cape Epic winners
German mountain bikers
Cyclists from Rhineland-Palatinate
Sportspeople from Novosibirsk
Soviet emigrants to West Germany
People from Alzey-Worms
Soviet male cyclists